The Treaty of St. Louis is the name of a series of treaties signed between the United States and various Native American tribes from 1804 through 1824.  The fourteen treaties were all signed in the St. Louis, Missouri area.

The Treaty of St. Louis of 1804 was a treaty signed by William Henry Harrison for the United States and representatives of the Sauk and Meskwaki tribes led by Quashquame, signed on November 3, 1804, and proclaimed on February 21, 1805.  Despite the name, the treaty was conducted at Portage des Sioux, Missouri, located immediately north of St. Louis, Missouri. In exchange for an annual payment of $1,000 in goods to be delivered to the tribe in St. Louis ($600 for the Sacs and $400 for the Fox), the tribes gave up a swath of land stretching from northeast Missouri through almost all of Illinois north of the Illinois River as well as a large section of southern Wisconsin. This treaty was deeply resented by the Sauk, especially Black Hawk, who felt that Quashquame was not authorized to sign treaties. This treaty led to many Sauk siding with the British during the War of 1812.

The specific terms for the boundary were:

The general boundary line between the lands of the United States and of the said Indian tribes shall be as follows, to wit: Beginning at a point on the Missouri river opposite to the mouth of the Gasconade river; thence in a direct course so as to strike the river Jeffreon at the distance of thirty miles from its mouth, and down the said Jeffreon to the Mississippi, thence up the Mississippi to the mouth of the Ouisconsing river and up the same to a point which shall be thirty-six miles in a direct line from the mouth of the said river, thence by a direct line to the point where the Fox river (a branch of the Illinois) leaves the small lake called Sakaegan, thence down the Fox river to the Illinois river, and down the same to the Mississippi. And the said tribes, for and in consideration of the friendship and protection of the United States which is now extended to them, of the goods (to the value of two thousand two hundred and thirty-four dollars and fifty cents) which are now delivered, and of the annuity hereinafter stipulated to be paid, do hereby cede and relinquish forever to the United States, all the lands included within the above-described boundary.

Included in this cessation were the historic villages along the Rock River (Illinois), particularly Saukenuk. William Henry Harrison, the representative for the United States, was governor of the Indiana territory and of the District of Louisiana, superintendent of Indian Affairs for the said territory and district.  The party of Sauk who signed the treaty, led by Quashquame, were not expecting to negotiate land and did not include important tribal leaders who would ordinarily have been in such negotiations. Black Hawk never recognized the treaty as valid and this led him to side with the British against settlers in the area during the War of 1812.  The treaty was upheld again in the Treaties of Portage des Sioux in 1815 at the end of the war.  Black Hawk eventually led the Black Hawk War to fight its terms.

In his autobiography, Black Hawk recalled:

Quashquame, Pashepaho, Ouchequaka and Hashequarhiqua were sent by the Sacs to St. Louis to try and free a prisoner who had killed an American.  The Sac tradition was to see if the Americans would release their friend. They were willing to pay for the person killed, thus covering the blood and satisfying the relations of the murdered man.

Upon return Quashquame and party came up and gave us the following account of their mission:

On our arrival at St. Louis we met our American father and explained to him our business, urging the release of our friend.  The American chief told us he wanted land.  We agreed to give him some on the west side of the Mississippi, likewise more on the Illinois side opposite Jeffreon.  When the business was all arranged we expected to have our friend released to come home with us.  About the time we were ready to start our brother was let out of the prison. He started and ran a short distance when he was SHOT DEAD!

This was all they could remember of what had been said and done.  It subsequently appeared that they had been drunk the greater part of the time while at St. Louis.

This was all myself and nation knew of the treaty of 1804.  It has since been explained to me.  I found by that treaty, that all of the country east of the Mississippi, and south of Jeffreon was ceded to the United States for one thousand dollars a year.  I will leave it to the people of the United States to say whether our nation was properly represented in this treaty?  Or whether we received a fair compensation for the extent of country ceded by these four individuals?

See also 
 Osage Treaty (disambiguation), several treaties
List of treaties
Indian Boundary Park - Chicago
First Treaty of Prairie du Chien
Second Treaty of Prairie du Chien
Third Treaty of Prairie du Chien
Fourth Treaty of Prairie du Chien
Treaty of Chicago

References

External links 
Kappler Project - Text of the 1804 Treaty

1804 treaties
1804 in the United States
November 1804 events
United States and Native American treaties
William Henry Harrison